Kees Bakker may refer to:

 Kees Bakker (zoologist) (1931–2010), professor at Leiden University Faculty of Ecology
 Kees Bakker (football) (1943–2020), Dutch football chairman (SBV Vitesse) and police officer

See also
 Kees Bekker (1883–1964), Dutch footballer